Taylor Sloat (born June 23, 1992) is an American football tight end.

Professional career
On January 5, 2015,  Sloat was signed to a future contract after spending time on the practice squad throughout the regular season.

References

External links
 Tampa Bay Buccaneers bio

1992 births
Living people
American football tight ends
Tampa Bay Buccaneers players
People from Woodland, California
Players of American football from California
Sportspeople from Greater Sacramento
UC Davis Aggies football players